Iran first participated at the Asian Para Games in 2010, and has sent athletes to compete in every Asian Para Games since then. The National Paralympic Committee for Iran is the I.R. Iran National Paralympic Committee.

Asian Para Games

Medals by Games

Asian Youth Para Games

Medals by Games

References
 Asian Paralympic Committee
 Asian Para Games

External links
Official website of the Iran Paralympic Committee

Nations at the Asian Para Games
Asian Para Games
Iran at the Asian Games